The 2015 Tour of Alberta was the third edition of the Tour of Alberta stage race. The event was included on the UCI America Tour, with a UCI classification of 2.1. As such, the race was only open to teams on the UCI Pro Tour, UCI Professional Continental and UCI Continental circuits. The race took place between September 2–7, 2015, as a six-day, six-stage race, traversing the province of Alberta. The race commences in Grande Prairie and finished in Edmonton.

Participating teams
The 15 teams invited to the race are:

Stages

Stage 1
September 2, 2015 — Grande Prairie to Grande Prairie,

Stage 2

Stage 3

Stage 4

Stage 5

Stage 6

Classification leadership

References

External links

Tour of Alberta
2015 in men's road cycling
2015 in Canadian sports
2015 in Alberta